The 2020 Simona Halep tennis season officially began on 5 January 2020 at the Sydney International. Simona Halep entered the season as the No. 6 ranked player in the world and finished the year ranked as the No. 2 ranked player in the world and the most titles among the WTA players (3).

Singles matches

Yearly records

Head-to-head matchups

Players are ordered by letter.
(Bold denotes a top 10 player at the time of the most recent match between the two players, Italic denotes top 50.)

References

2020 in Romanian tennis
2020 tennis player seasons
2020